General elections were held in Saint Kitts and Nevis on 3 July 1995. The result was a victory for the Saint Kitts and Nevis Labour Party, which won seven of the eleven directly-elected seats. Voter turnout was 68.4%.

Results

References

Saint Kitts
Elections in Saint Kitts and Nevis
1995 in Saint Kitts and Nevis